Anica Manuel João Neto a.k.a. Nequita (born December 27, 1972) is a former Angolan handball player. Neto was a member of the Angola women's handball team and played in three different olympic tournaments, namely in 1996, 2000 and 2004, before retiring in 2005.

References

External links
 
 Sports Reference Profile

Angolan female handball players
1972 births
Living people
Handball players from Luanda
Olympic handball players of Angola
Handball players at the 1996 Summer Olympics
Handball players at the 2000 Summer Olympics
Handball players at the 2004 Summer Olympics